Video Chess is a chess game for the Atari VCS (renamed to the Atari 2600 in 1982) programmed by Larry Wagner and Bob Whitehead and released by Atari in 1979. Both programmers later developed games for Activision.

Gameplay

The game is played from an overhead perspective. The player uses an "x" cursor to select and move pieces, rather than using chess notation. If an attempted move is illegal, a warning sound is made and the move is not made. If the right-most switch is set to A the computer plays as white; setting it to B lets the player play as white. With the left switch, selecting A allows the board to be set as the player pleases, whereas selecting B sets up the board for a regulation chess game.

There are eight different difficulty levels, with the computer-player taking a variable amount of time to determine its moves for each level. According to the manual that came with Video Chess, these were the average amount of time it would take at each level for the game to determine its move:

15 seconds
30 seconds
45 seconds
2 minutes, 45 seconds
3 minutes, 15 seconds
12 minutes
10 hours
10 seconds

The manual mentioned that these times were an average as other factors such as the complexity of the board position would impact the amount of time for the computer to determine its move.

Bugs
A feature of the two most difficult levels (6 and 7) is that the computer-player's prospective moves are displayed while it is processing. In easier levels the screen is blanked to a solid, but changing, color. However, in these two levels, the computer-player sometimes fails to return a piece to its original position, resulting in its making more than one move per turn.

Development
The box art of the first production run of the Atari Video Computer System featured a chess piece, even though Atari at the time was not contemplating designing a chess game. A man from Florida supposedly sued Atari over the box art; however, in an interview, Video Chess programmer Bob Whitehead said he was not aware of such a lawsuit.

At first, the idea of chess on the Atari VCS was considered to be impossible because of technological limitations. The hardware can only display three sprites in a row, or six (such as in Space Invaders) with the right programming. The eight-piece-wide chess board exceeds this limitation. Whitehead developed a technique known as "Venetian blinds" where the position of each sprite changes every scan line; this allows for eight or more sprites in a row.

Atari developed a bank switching ROM cartridge for prototypes of Video Chess that were larger than four kilobytes in size. The released version ended up fitting the standard 4K size, but this technology was later used for other Atari VCS titles.

Reception
Video Chess was reviewed by Video magazine in its "Arcade Alley" column where it was praised as "a reward for Atari owners" and a game that even basic chess players "should find rewarding for many hours of enjoyment."

See also

List of Atari 2600 games
Video Checkers

References

1979 video games
Atari 2600 games
Atari 2600-only games
Chess software
Video games developed in the United States